Chetan Chandra (born 10 April 1988) is an Indian actor working in the Kannada film industry.

Early life and family 
Chetan Chandra was born to K. B. Ramachandra and B. N. Anusuya. K. B. Ramachandra is a mining engineer in Malaysia. Chandra is a graduate in Information Science Engineering. He has a brother, Nitin Chandra.

Career
He made his acting debut in the 2008 released film, PUC alongside Harshika Poonacha, but was more noticed for the film Premism (2010). For the film Kumbha Rashi, he underwent a rigorous workout to develop eight pack abs.

He has signed a trilingual movie Nindru Kolvaan, a Tamil, Telugu and Kannada film directed by V. P. Shankar.

Filmography

References

External links 
Chetan Chandra gets busy in Sandalwood
Biscuit is a mirror of Bangalore: Chetan Chandra
 Chetan Chandra bags 'Love Churmuri'!

Living people
Male actors in Kannada cinema
Indian male film actors
People from Tumkur district
21st-century Indian male actors
1988 births